Heritage Auctions is an American multi-national auction house based in Dallas, Texas. Founded in 1976, Heritage is an auctioneer of numismatic collections, comics, fine art, books, luxury accessories, real estate, and memorabilia from film, music, history, and sports.

History 
In 1982, Heritage Auctions became an equal partnership between two collectors, Steve Ivy and Jim Halperin. In 1967, Ivy dropped out of the University of Texas at Austin to form Steve Ivy Rare Coin Co. in Dallas, Texas. In 1971, Halperin founded New England Rare Coin Galleries while still a freshman at Harvard University and would also later drop out of school. It was Ivy who first formed Heritage Auctions in Dallas in 1976 from his earlier, smaller business. The two often met at industry trade shows and auctions. In 1982, Halperin sold his Boston-based business and moved to Dallas to join Ivy. With him, he brought Marc Emory, a partner who heads what is now part of Heritage's European operations. Greg Rohan joined the company in 1986 and is now president of the company. Besides Ivy, Halperin, Rohan, and Emory, the company includes four other partners: Paul Minshull, Ryan Carroll, Todd Imhof, and Cristiano Bierrenbach.

In 1996, the company launched a website to allow the sale and purchase of coins in online auctions. This allowed Heritage to grow its list of potential sellers and buyers. At the urging of Halperin, Heritage began expanding its business model to include collectibles beyond numismatics by first including auctions of comic books in 2001. The company launched a memorabilia department in 2003 and its first auction was valued at about $2 million. In the mid-2000s, Heritage entered the music, entertainment, and film memorabilia market. By April 2006, the auction house was holding its third biennial auction of collectibles that once belonged to famous actors, musicians, directors, and other filmmakers. The collections sold at the auctions included many props, set pieces, and apparel from the sets of notable films and television series in history as well as personal effects of several musical artists. In 2010, Heritage launched its luxury items division, which includes jewelry, handbags, and other accessories. In some instances, rare items from these auctions have sold for over two hundred thousand dollars. By 2013, the auction house was also auctioning modern and contemporary art including works by artists such as Pablo Picasso, Andy Warhol, Joan Mitchell, and Edward Ruscha.

Right after the outbreak of the covid-19 pandemic, between April 20 and 27, the auction house's online sales totaled $41 million, 10% of the annual online sales of the entire previous year ($483 million in 2019). Heritage Auctions achieved sales in excess of $1.45 billion during 2022, not including the $103.5 million charity auction by Heritage of Dmitry Muratov's Nobel Peace Prize, from which 100% of proceeds were paid to UNICEF to fund humanitarian refugee relief.

Operations 
On June 1, 2020, as a cost-cutting measure, Heritage Auctions consolidated three Dallas-area locations to a new world headquarters in Irving, located at the northwest corner of West Airport Freeway and Valley View Lane near Dallas/Fort Worth International Airport. The 160,000 square foot facility is located in the DFW Airport international trade zone and will house 450 of the company's 600 employees. The company also has offices in New York located on Park Avenue. Its New York operations are mostly geared towards the fine arts industry. Heritage has a West Coast location in Beverly Hills, California, located on Olympic Boulevard. In 2011, Heritage acquired Greg Martin Auctions in San Francisco, California, forming the auction house's division specializing in weapons and armament.

Heritage expanded operations by adding an office in Hong Kong in 2015. In spring 2017, the company formed a Florida branch with offices in Palm Beach. In January 2017, company opened an office in Chicago.

Notable auctions 

 In October 2011, Heritage auctioned the personal property and movie memorabilia of the actor John Wayne for $5.4 million. The beret he wore in The Green Berets fetched $179,250. The following month, a copy of Action Comics #1, previously owned by Nicolas Cage, sold for $2.16 million, beating the previous record price for the comic of $1.5 million.
 In December 2015, an auction brought in more than $3 million for memorabilia from Sylvester Stallone's personal collection.
 A baseball-themed print by American illustrator Norman Rockwell was sold by Heritage Auctions in August 2017 for $1.6 million. The work was a study of Rockwell's Tough Call.
 In a continuing series of auctions starting in 2018, Heritage Auctions is auctioning a collection of memorabilia from the estate of Neil Armstrong, who died in 2012. The event was the first ever auction of the astronaut's personal collection and is billed to coincide with the 50th anniversary of the first landing on the Moon in 1969. About 3,000 items were up for auction and, as of October 2019, the auctions have brought in about $12 million.
 In January 2019, a rare 1943 Lincoln cent sold at Heritage auction for $204,000. The copper coin was created in error in 1943, when copper was meant to be reserved for the war effort. An original 1930 ink-on-paper drawing from the first Tintin comic book, Tintin in the Land of the Soviets, was sold by Heritage Auctions in June 2019. On November 20, 2019, Blueberry Custard (1961) by Wayne Thiebaud sold at a Heritage auction for $3.225 million, the second highest price brought in for a piece by the artist from Sacramento, California. The next day a near-mint condition Marvel Comics #1 sold for $1.26 million, setting the record for the most expensive Marvel comic sold in a public auction.
 On December 13, 2020, a Wayne Gretzky 1979-80 O-Pee-Chee rookie card sold for $1.29 million, becoming the most expensive hockey card sold at auction and the first to break the million-dollar barrier.
A US $20 bill with a Del Monte sticker sold for $396,000 on January 5, 2021 becoming the most expensive error note sold.
 A near-mint copy of Batman #1 from 1940 sold on January 14, 2021, for $2.22 million, setting a world record for a Batman comic book and the second most expensive comic ever sold at auction.
A Pokémon First Edition Base Set Sealed Booster Box sold for a world record-setting $408,000 on January 17, 2021.
 On January 24, 2021, Heritage Auctions sold the world's most valuable gold coin, a 1787 New York-style Brasher Doubloon, for $9.36 million.
 A signed Michael Jordan card fetched $1.44 million on February 4, 2021, making it the most expensive Jordan card ever sold at auction.
The Paramount Collection of world and ancient coins reached $41,941,592 on March 25–27, 2021, making it the most valuable world and ancient coins auction. The auction included a $2.28 million world record for the most expensive British coin ever sold at public auction.
An original poster promoting a 1953 Hank Williams concert in Canton, Ohio on New Year's Day sold for a record $150,000 on May 1, 2021, beating out The Beatles as the world's most expensive concert poster ever sold at auction.
 The Joseph Christian Leyendecker painting Beat-up Boy, Football Hero, which appeared on the cover of The Saturday Evening Post, sold for a record $4.12 million on May 7, 2021. The previous world record for a J.C. Leyendecker original was set in December, when Sotheby's sold his 1930 work Carousel Ride for $516,100.
On May 9, 2021, a game-worn jersey belonging to Michael Jordan from his sophomore season at the University of North Carolina was sold for $1.38 million, making it the most expensive Jordan jersey sold.
 An unopened copy of Nintendo's Super Mario 64 from 1996 sold at auction for $1.56 million on July 11, 2021, a new record for a video game. The previous record was an unopened copy of Nintendo's The Legend of Zelda which sold only two days earlier for $870,000.
 A copy of Amazing Fantasy #15 graded CGC 9.6 sold by Heritage Auctions in September 2021 set an all-time record price paid for any comic book at $3.6M, surpassing the $3.25M paid for an Action Comics #1 CGC 8.5, the first appearance of Superman, in April 2021.
 In December 2021 Heritage Auctions sold a first edition Harry Potter and the Philosopher’s Stone for $471,000, a record for the book with a first printing of 500.
 In January 2022 a single sheet of original comic artwork from page 25 of Marvel Comics’ Secret Wars No. 8, showing the first appearance of his black suit, sold at auction for a record $3.36 million.
 In April 2022, Heritage Auctions broke the record for the highest priced concert poster with a $275,000 sale of a rare Beatles 1966 Shea Stadium poster. The previous record of $150,000, a poster for Hank Williams’ last scheduled performance, was set by Heritage Auctions a year ago.
 In May 2022, an 1863 Liberty Double Eagle from The Bob R. Simpson Collection, the finest known example of ten to 12 remaining in all grades from a mintage of only 30 coins, more than doubled the previous auction record for this rare coin.
 The original cover art for the first issue of Batman: The Dark Knight Returns achieved $2.4 million at a June, 2022 Heritage Auctions sale, making it the most expensive American comic book cover art sold.
 Russian journalist Dmitry Muratov's Nobel Peace Prize, sold to benefit refugees from Ukraine through UNICEF. The medal sold on June 21, 2022 for US$103.5 million, the highest price ever recorded for a Nobel medal.
 Heritage auctioned a 1952 Topps Mickey Mantle baseball card on August 27, 2022, for $12.6 million, setting a new record. It was the first (and is thus far, the only) time a sports collectible item has ever sold at auction for an eight-figure price.

Controversies 
In 2009 Heritage Auctions was sued by former employee Gary Hendershott who alleged that the company engaged in fraud by using a shill bidder under the name "N.P. Gresham" to artificially increase bidding prices, an alleged violation of anti-racketeering laws. The lawsuit was dismissed with prejudice.

In 2012, the country of Mongolia sued Heritage Auctions for auctioning a 70-million-year-old fossil skeleton of a Tyrannosaurus bataar (75% complete) because the specimen came from Mongolia where exports of fossils are prohibited. Heritage subsequently assisted the Mongolian government in resolving ownership and storing the specimen for the parties until it could be legally repatriated to Mongolia 

In 2014, Heritage Auctions sued Christie's for hiring its primary handbags expert and two other handbag specialists, claiming it was a breach of contract and that trade secrets were stolen.

In 2016 Heritage Auctions sued Christie's along with its subsidy Collectrium for copyright infringement, claiming that Collectrium had inappropriately web-scraped three million of its listings. At the time, Collectrium was just bought by Christie's in 2015. In 2019 a judge ruled that Collectrium had to pay Heritage Auctions close to $1.8 million of the $49 million Heritage initially sought. The judge dismissed Heritage's claims of trespassing, unfair competition, and civil conspiracy, and also ruled that only Collectrium had any liability.

In December 2020, Heritage Auctions sold Margaret Keane's painting  Eyes Upon You which had actually been stolen from its owner in 1972. Through an FBI-mediated process, the painting was restituted to the owner's daughter and the buyer was refunded in full. The true owners thanked the FBI agent and Heritage in a written statement.

In August 2021 YouTuber Karl Jobst released a video that claimed that Heritage Auctions, along with the grading company Wata Games, had artificially created a collectable bubble in the sealed video game market through a conflict of interests. In a statement to Video Games Chronicle released following the video's publication, Heritage Auctions denied engaging in any illegal or unethical practices. Wata Games also denied the claims made in the video.

References

External links 

American auction houses
American companies established in 1976
Retail companies established in 1976
Numismatics
1976 establishments in Texas